Paleologus is a genus of stilt bugs in the family Berytidae. There are at least two described species in Paleologus.

Species
These two species belong to the genus Paleologus:
 Paleologus achitophel Fernando, 1960 c g
 Paleologus feanus Distant, W.L., 1902 c g
Data sources: i = ITIS, c = Catalogue of Life, g = GBIF, b = Bugguide.net

References

Further reading

 
 
 
 

Berytidae